The Nuclear Family is the name of a group of supervillains in DC Comics. Created by Jim Aparo and Mike W. Barr for the first issue of Outsiders, they are androids designed by a dying nuclear scientist to resemble himself and his deceased family.

The Nuclear Family made their first live adaptation in the DC Universe series' first season of Titans, portrayed by Jeff Clarke, Melody Johnson, Jeni Ross, Logan Thompson, and Zach Smadu.

Publication history
The Nuclear Family first appeared in Outsiders #1, and were created by Jim Aparo and Mike W. Barr.

Fictional team history
An early nuclear science researcher named Dr. Eric Shanner made some careless mistakes during his research which ended up exposing him and his family to dangerous levels of radiation. His family died and he was rendered ill with radiation poisoning. Afterward, Dr. Shanner made a vow to teach the world about the dangers of radiation. His began years later by building six androids resembling a younger version of his family, including himself. Each android was equipped with powers matching the various effects of nuclear weapons. Dr. Shanner then sent them to destroy the city of Los Angeles where they managed to damage the Esperanza Canyon Nuclear Power Plant during its opening day. When the Nuclear Family returned the next day to destroy the nuclear power plant, they ran afoul of the Outsiders but managed to defeat them. After briefly holding Looker captive and sedated, they fought the Outsiders again where they managed to destroy the Nuclear Family while Dr. Shanner expired from his nuclear radiation illness.

During the Infinite Crisis storyline, the Nuclear Family has been rebuilt and are seen as member of Alexander Luthor Jr.'s Secret Society of Super Villains. They were seen taking part in the Battle of Blüdhaven.

Members
The Nuclear Family have different powers and all have an immunity to radiation. The Nuclear Family consists of:

 Dad - The patriarch of the Nuclear Family. He can fly and emit immense amounts of radiation from his body.
 Mom - The matriarch of the Nuclear Family. She can fly and project an electromagnetic pulse which disables all electronic equipment around her.
 Biff - The older son of the Nuclear Family. He can fly and emit a thermal pulse that gives off the same heat found in a nuclear explosion.
 Sis - The only daughter of the Nuclear Family. She can fly and create a blast wave that can take down entire buildings.
 Brat - The younger son of the Nuclear Family. He can fly and transform himself into radioactive fallout.
 Dog - The pet of the Nuclear Family. It can fly and transform itself into radioactive fallout.

Other versions
A specialized training initiative workshopped by the Federal Bureau of Investigation dubbed the Nuclear Family Program featured in WildStorm imprint Wildcats Version 3.0. It featured an active team of spies, comprising two adults and a duo of young children taking after late 1950s suburban family sitcom roles of doting parents and their rambunctious kids. In truth they were the beta test phase of a new breed of government sponsored superhuman operatives, all of whom are vastly enhanced sleeper agents disguised as a modern middle class household. Designated to act as a safehouse observatory unit and sensitive package/asset caterers till their senior operators wire intel to act otherwise, they are highly adept in various deadly martial arts and weapon forms. On top of being well equipped with heavy ordinance, special combat training is further complemented by a host of cybernetic augmentations and chemical enhancements to increase field performance. As if a testament to their incredible practice regimens, just two of said unit managed to clip a small armed force headed by an infamous criminal data launderer's minute men and leave Grifter horrendously crippled in a tense encounter.

In other media
 The Nuclear Family appears in the Justice League Action episode "Nuclear Family Values", with Dad voiced by Kevin Shinick, Mom and Brat by Melissa Disney, Biff by Jason J. Lewis, and Sis by Rachel Kimsey, while dog sound effects were used for Dog. This version of the group were originally built by Dr. Eric Shanner during the Cold War to show people the side effects of using nuclear weapons. While the Nuclear Family were programmed to behave like a real family, they were unaware that they were androids. Upon gaining sentience and powers, they escaped to a home and go on a rampage, intending to destroy a nuclear power plant. They run afoul of Firestorm, who eventually restrains and places them in a small replica of a family house to stop them from causing more trouble.
 The Nuclear Family, also referred to simply as the "Family", appear in Titans, with Dad portrayed by Jeff Clarke, Mom by Melody Johnson, Sis by Jeni Ross, Biff by Logan Thompson, and series original character Stepdad portrayed by Zach Smadu. This version of the group were humans brainwashed by Dr. Adamson to become assassins under Trigon and use a serum to enhance their abilities. In the present, Adamson tasks the Family with locating and capturing Rachel Roth, only to be foiled by Kory Anders, who kills Dad. After being joined by Stepdad, the Family find Roth once more, only to be defeated and captured by her, Anders, Dick Grayson, and Garfield Logan. Upon learning of this, Adamson detonates planted explosives in the Family's heads.

References

External links
 Nuclear Family at Comic Vine
 Nuclear Family at Angelfire

Characters created by Jim Aparo
DC Comics supervillain teams
Fictional families
Characters created by Mike W. Barr
Comics characters introduced in 1985